The AIDC T-CH-1 Chung Hsing was a turboprop-powered military trainer aircraft produced in Taiwan (Republic of China).

Development

Derived from the North American T-28 Trojan trainer, the first T-CH-1 prototype flew on 23 November 1973. A second prototype flew the following year. The T-CH-1 was a conventional, low-wing monoplane with tricycle undercarriage that accommodated the student and instructor in tandem.

Production of fifty aircraft for the Republic of China Air Force was spread out between March 1976 and 1981.

Variants
 T-CH-1 Chung Hsing : Two-seat basic trainer, light attack aircraft for the Republic of China Air Force.
 A-CH-1 : Two-seat weapons training aircraft for the Republic of China Air Force.
 R-CH-1 : Two-seat reconnaissance aircraft for the Republic of China Air Force.

Operators

 Republic of China Air Force

Specifications

See also

References

External links

 AIDC T-CH-1 official web page

T-CH-1
1970s Taiwanese military trainer aircraft
Single-engined turboprop aircraft
Single-engined tractor aircraft
Low-wing aircraft
Aircraft first flown in 1973